Werner Heyde (aka Fritz Sawade) (25 April 1902 – 13 February 1964) was a German psychiatrist. He was one of the main organizers of Nazi Germany's T-4 Euthanasia Program.

Early life
Heyde was born in Forst (Lausitz), on May 25, in 1902, and completed his Abitur in 1920. From 1922-1925, he studied medicine in Berlin, Freiburg, Marburg, Rostock and Würzburg and after short placements at the General Hospital in Cottbus and the sanatorium Berlin-Wittenau became assistant doctor at the Universitätsnervenklinik (university psychiatric hospital) in Würzburg. He obtained his licence to practice medicine in 1926, having completed all courses throughout his studies with top marks.

Career until 1945
In 1933, Heyde made the acquaintance of Theodor Eicke, and became a member of the NSDAP. One year later, he was appointed director of the polyclinic in Würzburg. In 1935, he entered the SS as medical officer with the rank of SS-Hauptsturmführer, and became commander of the medical unit in the SS-Totenkopfverbände. There he was responsible for establishing a system of psychiatric and eugenic examinations and research in concentration camps, and for the organisation and the patient selection process of the Aktion T-4 Euthanasia Program. Additionally, he also worked as a psychiatric consultant for the Gestapo. He also was leader of the Rassenpolitisches Amt in Würzburg, Seelbergstraße 8, 97080 Würzburg. Later he was accompanied by his Rassenpolitisches Amt assistant, Mr. Johannes Riedmiller aka Kurt Riethmüller aka Hans Riedmüller/Hans Riedmiller.

In 1938, he was appointed chief of staff of the medical department in the SS-Hauptamt (headquarters); in 1939, he became professor for psychiatry and neurology at the University of Würzburg, and from 1940 on he also was director of the psychiatric hospital.

He was replaced as head of the T4 program by Paul Nitsche in 1941, but continued his involvement as member of the "department Brack" (after the end of World War II, it was never found out what his role there was).

He worked at Buchenwald, Dachau concentration camp and Sachsenhausen concentration camps.

In 1944, he was awarded the SS-Totenkopfring, and before the end of the war reached the rank of SS-Standartenführer (Colonel).

Life after 1945; arrest and suicide
After World War II, Heyde was interned and imprisoned, but escaped in 1947. He went underground using the alias Fritz Sawade and continued practicing as a sports physician and psychiatrist in Flensburg. Many friends and associates knew about his real identity, but remained silent even as he was an expert witness in court cases.

His true identity was revealed in the course of a private quarrel, and on 11 November 1959 Heyde surrendered to police in Frankfurt after 13 years as a fugitive. On 13 February 1964, five days before his trial was to start, Heyde hanged himself at the prison in Butzbach.

Literature
Klee, Ernst, Das Personenlexikon zum Dritten Reich. S. Fischer Verlag 2003. 
Godau-Schüttke, Klaus-Detlev, Die Heyde/Sawade-Affäre. Nomos Verlagsgesellschaft 1998.

Films
1963 (GDR): The Heyde-Sawade Affair (Category: biography/drama) (Produced in the DEFA-studios for movies, Potsdam, Babelsberg/Eastern Germany. Produced by Bernhard Gelbe; script by Wolfgang Luderer, Walter Jupé and Friedrich Karl Kaul and directed by Wolfgang Luderer. Available via the Foundation German TV and Broadcast Arkhive Babelsberg. Arkhive-No. IDNR 03581. Length: 101 minutes, First run: 3 June 1963 in the television programme No. 1 of the German Democratic Republic).

Paintings
In 1965, German artist Gerhard Richter painted Herr Heyde, based on a photo of Heyde's 1959 arrest.

See also
Ethnic cleansing
Nazi doctors (list)
Nazi eugenics
Genocide
National Socialist Party
Psychiatry
Racial hygiene
racial policy of Nazi Germany
T-4 Euthanasia Program
Friedrich Panse 	
 List of people who died by suicide by hanging
Am Spiegelgrund clinic

References

1902 births
1964 suicides
People from Forst (Lausitz)
People from the Province of Brandenburg
Nazi Party members
SS-Standartenführer
Aktion T4 personnel
Historians of Nazism
German psychiatrists
Physicians in the Nazi Party
20th-century German historians
University of Freiburg alumni
University of Marburg alumni
University of Rostock alumni
University of Würzburg alumni
Academic staff of the University of Würzburg
Kapp Putsch participants
20th-century Freikorps personnel
Nazis who committed suicide in prison custody
Holocaust perpetrators in Germany
Prisoners who died in German detention